Francis Howard may refer to:

 Francis Howard, 5th Baron Howard of Effingham (1643–1694/5), English Governor of Virginia
 Francis Howard, 1st Earl of Effingham (1683–1743), English army officer
Sir Francis Howard (British Army officer, born 1848) (1848–1930), British general
Sir Francis Howard (MP), Member of Parliament (MP) for Windsor
 Francis William Howard (1867–1944), American prelate of the Roman Catholic Church
 Francis Howard (priest) (1872–1949), Censor of Fitzwilliam House, Cambridge
 Francis Key Howard (1826–1872), editor
 Francis Howard (actor) (1917–1992), English comedian and actor known as Frankie Howerd
 Francis Howard (footballer) (1931–2007), English association football player

See also
Frank Howard (disambiguation)
Frances Howard (disambiguation), for the female version of the name